Trapelia is a genus of lichenized fungi in the family Trapeliaceae.

Species
Trapelia antarctica 
Trapelia atrocarpa 
Trapelia calvariana 
Trapelia coarctata 
Trapelia collaris 
Trapelia concentrica 
Trapelia coreana 
Trapelia corticola 
Trapelia crystallifera 
Trapelia elacista 
Trapelia glebulosa 
Trapelia herteliana 
Trapelia involuta 
Trapelia lilacea 
Trapelia macrospora 
Trapelia obtegens 
Trapelia placodioides 
Trapelia rubra 
Trapelia sitiens 
Trapelia stipitata 
Trapelia thieleana 
Trapelia tristis

References

Baeomycetales
Lichen genera
Baeomycetales genera
Taxa described in 1929
Taxa named by Maurice Choisy